Igor Lobanov (born 14 September 1946) is a Soviet diver. He competed in the men's 10 metre platform event at the 1964 Summer Olympics.

References

1946 births
Living people
Soviet male divers
Olympic divers of the Soviet Union
Divers at the 1964 Summer Olympics
Place of birth missing (living people)
Medalists at the 1970 Summer Universiade